Patricia Bruder (born April 14, 1936, in Brooklyn, New York) is an American actress.

Bruder entered show business when she was 9 years old, performing in the chorus of Rainbow House on radio. She attended James Madison High School, and graduated in June 1954, after which she attended Columbia University. Her work on stage included the Broadway productions Lace on Her Petticoat (1951), Livin' the Life (1957), and Gypsy (1959), in all of which she was billed as Patsy Bruder. She also appeared in off-Broadway productions.

Her most enduring television role was her portrayal of Ellen Lowell on the soap opera As the World Turns, which she played from 1960 to 1995, taking the role over from actress Wendy Drew. Bruder grew in time with her character, as who gradually changes from a young woman into a mature matriarch, marrying two respected doctors - Tim Cole and David Stewart - on the serial.  Bruder's major storylines center on the murder of David's housekeeper, Franny Brennan, when Franny threatened to tell her son Jimmy (also known as Dr. Dan Stewart) the truth about his parentage. She went to prison where she met her best friend Sandy Wilson (Dagne Crane) who later married Bob Hughes (Don Hastings). Later storylines focus on being the moral support for daughters Annie and Dee.

In 1995, her character was written out for the third time, but she made a guest appearance in 1998. Bruder continues to be a popular voice for voice-over work. She is married to Charles Debrovner, a physician. She has two daughters, Caroline and Diane, and one granddaughter, Jane.  When she is not acting, she enjoys playing the piano.

References

External links

American soap opera actresses
American voice actresses
Actresses from New York City
1936 births
Living people
People from Brooklyn
James Madison High School (Brooklyn) alumni
21st-century American women